Australians in the United Arab Emirates consist of 16,000 expatriates, most of whom live in Dubai and the capital of Abu Dhabi.

Migration history
Australians are attracted by the lifestyle Dubai offers, including the wealth of outdoor activities for their families. However, their population fell in 2009 due to the downturn in the economy of Dubai, as retrenched Australian expatriates with underwater real-estate loans fled the country to avoid debtor's prison.

Organisations
In Dubai, Australian and New Zealander expatriates joined to set up the Australia New Zealand Association, which aims to provide mutual support for their communities in the entire UAE.

The Australian International School, Sharjah is an established international school, catering to much of the Australian community. The school's education system and syllabus is Queensland-curriculum based.

See also

 Australia–United Arab Emirates relations
 Unity Resources Group

References

External links
Australia New Zealand Association, UAE
Aussies Abroad - Abu Dhabi

 
Ethnic groups in the United Arab Emirates
United Arab Emirates